Wolcottsburg is a hamlet in the town of Clarence in Erie County, New York, United States.

History  

The settlement was originally known as West Prussia due to the large number of Prussian inhabitants. There is a German Lutheran church at the end of Wolcott Road that was constructed in 1873 and still stands today.

Marvin's Bar & Grill is the sole remaining business in Wolcottsburg, although there were once  two stores and a hotel.

Geography
A small stream, known as Black Creek, runs through the town and ends just after Goodrich Road.

There is a small airstrip located in the western portion of the hamlet.

References

Hamlets in New York (state)
Hamlets in Erie County, New York